The official languages of the United Nations are the six languages that are used in UN meetings and in which all official UN documents are written. In the six languages, four are the official language or national language of permanent members in the Security Council, while the remaining two are used due to the large number of their speakers. In alphabetical order of the Latin alphabet, they are:
 Arabic (Modern Standard Arabic) – official or national language of several countries in the Middle East and North Africa, and used in the Arab world.
 Chinese (Mandarin Chinese in simplified Chinese characters) – official language of the People's Republic of China.
 English – majority and de facto official language of the United Kingdom, the United States and Australia, and majority (de jure) official language of Canada and New Zealand. It is also the most popular language, the most popular lingua franca, and a majority and/or official language in several other countries and territories.
 French – official language of France. It is also official in Belgium, Switzerland, Canada, and several countries in Africa.
 Russian – official language of the Russian Federation. It is also used in several post-Soviet states.
 Spanish – official or national language in 18 countries and one territory in the Americas (mostly Latin America or Hispanic America), Spain, and Equatorial Guinea.

Description
These languages are used at meetings of various UN organs, particularly the General Assembly (Article 51 of its Rules of Procedure), the Economic and Social Council and the Security Council (Article 41 of its Rules of Procedure). Each representative of a country may speak in any one of these six languages or may speak in any language and provide interpretation into one of the six official languages. The UN provides simultaneous interpretation from the official language into the other five official languages, via the United Nations Interpretation Service.

The six official languages are also used for the dissemination of official documents. Generally, the texts in each of the six languages are equally authoritative. Most UN councils use all six languages as official and working languages; however, as of 2019 the United Nations Secretariat uses only two working languages: English and French.

The six official languages spoken at the UN are the first or second language of 2.8 billion people on the planet, less than half of the world population. The six languages are official languages in almost two-thirds of United Nations member states (over 120 states).

History
In 1920, the League of Nations was one of the first international institutions to promote the concept of international official languages to foster communication and spur global diplomacy in the aftermath of the brutality of World War I. The League of Nations selected English, French, and Spanish as official languages with English and French being the working languages. English and French were chosen due to the global reach of the British Empire and the French Empire. Spanish was selected due to the large number of first-language speakers in Latin America and the former Spanish Empire. There was an effort to select Esperanto as an additional language of the League but that was rejected.

In the 1940s, as the conclusion of World War II was nearing, the Allies held a multitude of conferences, including the London Declaration, the Arcadia Conference, the Cairo Conference, the Tehran Conference, the Yalta Conference and the Potsdam Conference. These conferences were meant to coordinate and plan the post-war world, including how to promote world peace in the aftermath of the war, how to facilitate of global communication through an international auxiliary language (such as Esperanto) or an existing group of languages, and how handle the decolonization of Africa and Asia. Additionally, these conferences led to the establishment of the United Nations as the successor of the League of Nations.

In 1945, this culminated in the Charter of the UN, its constituent document signed at the San Francisco Conference, which did not expressly provide for official languages. The Charter was initially enacted in five languages (Chinese, English, French, Russian, and Spanish). The United Nations selected these original five languages because in addition to being utilized by the League of Nations, they were also the de facto official languages of the major Allied nations, including the Big Four: the British Empire, the United States, the Soviet Union and the Republic of China plus French which was the language of France and the French colonies. These nations: the UK, the US, the USSR, Republic of China, and France, became the five Permanent Members of the UN Security Council. Unofficially, the UN held its operations in English and French; however, the Charter provided (in Article 111) that the five languages be equally authoritative.

In 1946, the first session of the United Nations General Assembly adopted rules of procedure concerning languages that purported to apply to "all the organs of the United Nations, other than the International Court of Justice", formally setting out five (5) official languages and two (2) working languages (English and French).

The following year, the second session of the General Assembly adopted permanent rules of procedure, Resolution 173 (II). The part of those rules relating to language closely followed the 1946 rules, except that the 1947 rules did not purport to apply to other UN organs, just the General Assembly. Meanwhile, a proposal had been in the works to add Spanish as a third working language in addition to English and French. This was adopted in Resolution 262 (III), passed on 11 December 1948.

In 1968, Russian was added as a working language of the General Assembly  so that, of the GA's five official languages, four (all but Chinese) were working.

In 1973, the General Assembly made Chinese a working language and switched to using Simplified Chinese characters. They also added Arabic as both an official language and working language of the GA. Thus all six official languages were also working languages. Arabic was made an official and working language of "the General Assembly and its Main Committees", whereas the other five languages had status in all GA committees and subcommittees (not just the main committees). The Arab members of the UN had agreed to pay the costs of implementing the resolution, for three years.

In 1980, the General Assembly got rid of this final distinction, making Arabic an official and working language of all its committees and subcommittees, as of 1 January 1982. At the same time, the GA requested the Security Council to include Arabic among its official and working languages, and the Economic and Social Council to include Arabic among its official languages, by 1 January 1983.

As of 1983, the Security Council (like the General Assembly) recognized six official and working languages: Arabic, Chinese, English, French, Russian, and Spanish.

In the Economic and Social Council, as of 1992, there were six official languages (Arabic, Chinese, English, French, Russian and Spanish) of which three were working languages (English, French, and Spanish). Later, Arabic, Chinese, and Russian were added as working languages in the Economic and Social Council.

In 2001, the United Nations drew criticism for relying too heavily on English, and not enough on the other five official languages and Spanish-speaking member nations formally brought this to the attention of the secretary-general. Additionally, there was a movement to consider adding official languages or creating a grouping of semi-official languages for languages with over 50 million speakers. This did not happen. Secretary General Kofi Annan responded to these criticisms that full parity of the six official languages was unachievable within current budgetary restraints, but he nevertheless attached great importance to improving the linguistic balance and worked to increase parity between the existing 6 official languages.

On 8 June 2007, resolutions concerning human resources management at the UN, the General Assembly had emphasized "the paramount importance of the equality of the six official languages of the United Nations" and requested that the secretary-general "ensure that vacancy announcements specified the need for either of the working languages of the Secretariat, unless the functions of the post required a specific working language".

In 2008 and 2009, resolutions of the General Assembly have urged the Secretariat to respect the parity of the six official languages, especially in the dissemination of public information.

The secretary-general's most recent report on multilingualism was issued on 4 October 2010. In response, on 19 July 2011, the General Assembly adopted Resolution No. A/RES/65/311 on multilingualism, calling on the secretary-general, once again, to ensure that all six official languages are given equally favourable working conditions and resources. The resolution noted with concern that the multilingual development of the UN website had improved at a much slower rate than expected. The drive to improve parity and focus on multilingualism continued throughout the 2010s and led to the United Nations news and media website (https://news.un.org/en/) to begin including translations of its content into Hindi, Portuguese, and Swahili in 2018.

In 2020, UN Portuguese Language Day was created in addition to the UN Language Day's associated with the six official languages.

In June 2022, the United Nations General Assembly adopted a resolution on multilingualism that encouraged UN organizations to disseminate important communication and messages in official as well as non-official languages, similar to the semi-official policies proposed to Kofi Annan and Ban Ki-moon. These languages included Bengali, Hindi, Persian, Portuguese, Swahili, and Urdu and the GA recognizes the efforts of the UN to use non-official languages too.

In July 2022, UN Swahili Language Day was created. Portuguese and Swahili are the only non-official UN languages to have a UN Language Day.

Timeline of official languages

UN News
As of June 2018, the media branch of the United Nations, UN News (https://news.un.org), includes website translations into Hindi, Portuguese, and Swahili in addition to the 6 official languages. Other UN documents and websites are also translated into Bengali (referred to as Bangla), French Creole, Indonesian/Malay, Turkish, and Urdu, but not on an official or consistent basis.

Proposed additional languages

While there are no formal proposals before the General Assembly to add another official language, various individuals and states have informally raised the possibility of adding a new official language to accommodate more of the world's population. It has been noted that the six official languages are mostly spoken in the Northern Hemisphere and therefore many of the proposed languages are spoken in the Southern Hemisphere. Most of the proposed languages are world languages and rank as Level 0 (International) on the Expanded Graded Intergenerational Disruption Scale (EGIDS) and tend to be lingua francas that are either supra-regional or supercentral according to the global language system theory.

Bengali
Bengali is the fifth most spoken native language in the world, with over 300 million speakers, after Chinese, Spanish, English and Hindi. In April 2009, Prime Minister of Bangladesh Sheikh Hasina argued in front of the United Nations General Assembly that the Bengali language should be made one of the official languages of the UN. This was backed by a resolution adopted unanimously by the assembly of the Indian state of West Bengal in December.

Hindi
Hindi is the fourth most spoken native language in the world, after Chinese, Spanish, and English. It is one of the official languages of India and Fiji (as Fiji Hindi) and its dialects are still being spoken by minorities in Nepal, Suriname and Mauritius (to a lesser extent). It is mutually intelligible to a high degree with Urdu which is official and spoken in Pakistan and together they are often considered the same language, referred to as Hindustani or Hindi-Urdu. Although very similar verbally, they do have different written scripts; Hindi is written in the Devanagari script and Urdu is written in the Nastaʿlīq script. Hindi has more than 550 million speakers in India alone, of whom 422 million are native, 98.2 million are second language speakers, and 31.2 million are third language speakers. Hindi is the lingua franca of the northern part of India, along with Pakistan (as Urdu), with its importance as a global language increasing day by day.

In 2007, it was reported that the government of India would "make immediate diplomatic moves to seek the status of an official language for Hindi at the United Nations". According to a 2009 press release from its Ministry of External Affairs, the Government of India has been "working actively" to have Hindi recognized as an official language of the UN. In 2015, Nepal's Vice President Parmananda Jha stated his firm support for the inclusion of Hindi as an official language of the UN.

Indonesian/Malay
Indonesian/Malay is an Austronesian macrolanguage spoken throughout Brunei, Indonesia, Malaysia, and Singapore. It is an official language in Brunei, Malaysia and Singapore where it is known as Standard Malay or Bahasa Melayu, and is the official language of Indonesia where it is referred to as Indonesian or Bahasa Indonesia. It is used widely throughout Southeast Asia as a lingua franca. Spoken by more than 290 million people, Indonesian is considered the 11th most commonly spoken language by Ethnologue, as of 2022. Indonesian and Malay is also prominent on the internet, with one estimate ranking it sixth by number of Internet users.

The Indonesian Ministry of Education and Culture (Kemendikbud) has increasingly promoted Indonesian as an international language, with one targets aiming for official UN language status by 2045.

Portuguese
Portuguese is the sixth most spoken language in the world. Many Lusophones have advocated for greater recognition of their language, which is widely spoken across five continents: Portugal in Europe; Brazil (the largest lusophone nation) in South America; Angola, Mozambique, Cape Verde, Guinea-Bissau, Equatorial Guinea, São Tomé and Príncipe in Africa; Timor-Leste and Macau in Asia. It is an official language in ten countries.

In 2008, the President of Portugal announced that the then eight leaders of the Community of Portuguese Language Countries (CPLP) had agreed to take the necessary steps to make Portuguese an official language. The media branch of the UN, UN News, already includes translations into Portuguese.

Swahili
Swahili is a lingua franca throughout eastern Africa and is especially prevalent in the African Great Lakes region. Swahili, known as Kiswahili by its speakers, is an official language of Eacu, Rwanda, and the Democratic Republic of the Congo, is an official language of the African Union and is officially recognised as a lingua franca of the East African Community. It is one of the most commonly spoken languages in Africa, is a compulsory subject in all Kenyan schools and is increasingly being used in eastern Burundi.

With between 150 and 200 million speakers, the Swahili lexicon is similar to that of other eastern Bantu languages such as Comorian, which have differing levels of mutual intelligibility. Swahili is already used unofficially in many UN organizations as the UN has an office in Nairobi (the United Nations Office at Nairobi), in addition to other major UN global offices in New York City, Vienna, and Geneva). The media branch of the UN, UN News, already includes translations into Swahili.

Turkish
In September 2011, during a meeting with UN Secretary-General Ban Ki-moon, Turkish Prime Minister Recep Tayyip Erdoğan expressed a desire to see Turkish become an official UN language.

Coordinator for Multilingualism
In a 1999 resolution, the General Assembly requested the secretary-general to "appoint a senior Secretariat official as coordinator of questions relating to multilingualism throughout the Secretariat."

The first such coordinator was Federico Riesco of Chile, appointed on 6 September 2000.

Following Riesco's retirement, Miles Stoby of Guyana was appointed Coordinator for Multilingualism, effective 6 September 2001.

In 2003, Secretary-General Kofi Annan appointed Shashi Tharoor of India as Coordinator for Multilingualism. This responsibility was in addition to Tharoor's role as under-secretary-general for communications and public information, head of the Department of Public Information.

The current Coordinator for Multilingualism is Catherine Pollard of Guyana. She replaces Kiyo Akasaka of Japan, who was also under-secretary-general for communications and public information.

Language Days at the UN

In 2010, the UN's Department of Public Information announced an initiative of six "language days" to be observed throughout the year, one for each official language, with the goal of celebrating linguistic diversity and learning about the importance of cross-cultural communication. In 2020 Portuguese Language Day was added and in 2022 Swahili Language Day was added. The days and their historical significance are:
 UN Arabic Language Day: 18 December (the date on which the United Nations General Assembly designated Modern Standard Arabic (MSA) as the fourth official language of the United Nations in 1973).
 UN Chinese Language Day: first celebrated 12 November; now set on 20 April ("to pay tribute to Cang Jie")
 UN English Language Day: 23 April ("the date traditionally observed as the birthday of William Shakespeare")
 UN French Language Day: 20 March (corresponding to the Journée internationale de la Francophonie)
 UN Portuguese Language Day: 5 May (the date in 2009 that the Community of Portuguese Language Countries (CPLP) was established to represent the Lusophone countries))
 UN Russian Language Day: 6 June (the birthday of Alexander Pushkin)
 UN Spanish Language Day: first celebrated on 12 October (celebrated in the Spanish-speaking world as "Día de la Hispanidad"; compare Columbus Day), now set on 23 April (in honor of Miguel de Cervantes, who died on the same day in 1616)
 UN Swahili Language Day: 7 July (the date Julius Nyerere adopted the Swahili Language as a unifying language for independence struggles.)

UN specialized agencies
UN independent agencies have their own sets of official languages that sometimes are different from that of the principal UN organs. For example, the General Conference of UNESCO has nine official languages including Hindi, Italian, and Portuguese. The Universal Postal Union has just one official language, French. IFAD has four official languages: Arabic, English, French, and Spanish.

Parallels with other multilingual institutions
The next largest international grouping after the UN is the Commonwealth of Nations which is exclusively English speaking and has 56 members, and the Organisation internationale de la francophonie which is exclusively French speaking and has 54 members. All other international bodies in commerce, transport and sport have tended to the adoption of one or a few languages as the means of communication. This is usually English and French (see: list of international organisations which have French as an official language). Regional groups have adopted what is common to other elements of their ethnic or religious background. Standard Arabic is usually adopted across Muslim nation groups. Most of non-Arab Africa is either Francophone or Anglophone because of their imperial past, but there is also a lusophone grouping of countries for the same reason.

See also

 List of official languages
 List of official languages by institution
 List of languages by number of native speakers
 List of languages by total number of speakers
 Languages of the European Union
 International Mother Language Day
 League of Nations Languages and Symbols
 The Interpreter
 Waste Isolation Pilot Plant#Warning messages for future humans

References

External links
 Information about Languages
 2017 Report of the Secretary-General on Multilingualism
 Language Log
 Multilingualism at the United Nations : Research Guide
 Top UN official stresses need for Internet multilingualism to bridge digital divide

History of the United Nations
United Nations
United Nations
United Nations mass media
Official languages
Language policy in the United Nations